Magnacarina is a genus of spiders in the family Theraphosidae. It was first described in 2016 by Mendoza, Locht, Kaderka, Medina & Pérez-Miles. , it contains 4 species.

References

Theraphosidae
Theraphosidae genera
Spiders of Mexico